The Bridge of Toledo (Spanish: Puente de Toledo) is a bridge located in Madrid, Spain. It was built in a Baroque style between 1718 and 1732 by architect Pedro de Ribera and spans the Manzanares River, linking the Pyramids roundabout on the east bank with Marqués de Vadillo Square on the west bank.

It was declared Bien de Interés Cultural in 1956.

Gallery

References 

Toledo
Bien de Interés Cultural landmarks in Madrid